The 2020 Mid-Season Streamathon was an esports live stream event hosted by Riot Games, featuring international competitions and exhibition matches from multiple regions. It was the replacement for the 2020 Mid-Season Invitational, which was cancelled due to the global COVID-19 pandemic. The primary goal of the event was to raise money for COVID-19 relief efforts.

Mid-Season Cup 

The 2020 Mid-Season Cup was an international tournament featuring the top four teams from the spring season of the LCK (South Korea) and LPL (China). Games are played online with artificially standardized ping to ensure competitive integrity. Players compete onsite at their respective league's home arenas, but without a live audience present. The tournament's total prize pool was US$600,000.

Participants 
 LCK
  T1
  Gen.G
  DragonX
  DAMWON Gaming

 LPL
  JD Gaming
  Top Esports
  FunPlus Phoenix
  Invictus Gaming

Group stage 
 Format: Single round robin, best-of-one

 Group A

 Group B

 Tiebreakers

Knockout stage 
 Format: Best-of-five

Ranking

Mid-Season Showdown 

The 2020 Mid-Season Showdown was an international tournament featuring the top two teams from the spring season of the VCS (Vietnam) and PCS (Taiwan, Hong Kong, Macau, and Southeast Asia; excluding Vietnam). Games are played online with artificially standardized ping to ensure competitive integrity.

Participants 
 PCS
  Talon Esports
  Machi Esports

 VCS
  Team Flash
  GAM Esports

Group stage 
 Format: Double round robin, best-of-one

Knockout stage 
 Format: Best-of-five

EU Face-Off

Participants 
  LEC Kings
  The French Zoo
  German Pingus
  Double Crunch Italy
  Polska Gurom
  ALTOKEKW Españita

Group stage 
 Format: Single round robin, best-of-one

 Group A

 Group B

Knockout stage 
 Format: Best-of-one

References 

M
League of Legends competitions
M
Impact of the COVID-19 pandemic on the video game industry
2020 multiplayer online battle arena tournaments